The 2004 ICC Under-19 World Cup was an international limited-overs cricket tournament played in Bangladesh from 15 February to 5 March 2004. It was the fifth edition of the Under-19 Cricket World Cup and the first to be held in Bangladesh.

The 2004 World Cup was contested by sixteen teams, including one (Uganda) making its tournament debut. After an initial group stage, the top eight teams played off in a super league to decide the tournament champions, with the non-qualifiers playing a separate "plate" competition. Pakistan and the West Indies eventually progressed to the final, played at the Bangabandhu National Stadium in Dhaka, where Pakistan won by 25 runs to claim their maiden title. The West Indies had been making their first appearance in the final. Indian batsman Shikhar Dhawan was named player of the tournament and was the leading run-scorer, while Bangladesh's Enamul Haque was the leading wicket-taker.

Teams and qualification

The ten full members of the International Cricket Council (ICC) qualified automatically:

 
 
 
 
 

 
 
 
 
 

Another six teams qualified through regional qualification tournaments:

2003 Africa/EAP U19 Championship
 (1st place)
 (2nd place)
2003 Americas U19 Championship
  (1st place)

2003 European U19 Championship
  (1st place)
  (2nd place)
2003 Youth Asia Cup
  (1st place)

Group stage

Group A

Group B

Group C

Group D

Plate competition
The plate competition was contested by the eight teams that failed to qualify for the Super League.

Group 1

Group 2

Semi-finals

Final

Super League

Group 1

Group 2

Semi-finals

Final

References

External Reference
EspnCricinfo

Under-19 World Cup
ICC Under-19 Cricket World Cup
Under-19 World Cup
International cricket competitions in Bangladesh
Under-19 Cricket World Cup
Under-19 Cricket World Cup
2004 ICC Under-19 Cricket World Cup